Eunice Lake is a lake located in the Ship Harbour Long Lake Wilderness Area in Nova Scotia, Canada. It can only be accessed by the Admiral Lake Loop of the Musquodoboit Trailways Association. The lake is about 320 meters long and 190 meters wide. The trailhead is about 2 km north of Musquodoboit Harbour.

Geographical Description
The lake is 50m AMSL and is very shallow, with a muddy bottom. It has several big rocks inside it and a high cliff on its north side. To its south lies a large ridge of rock, and beyond that lies a valley.

Access
It can only be accessed by the Admiral Lake Loop on the Musquodoboit Rail-Trail system. Other lakes encountered on the hike include Bayers Lake, Admiral Lake, and Little Lake.

References

External links
 Musquodoboit Trailways Association

Lakes of Nova Scotia